Bethany Jean Alvord (born June 20, 1957) is an American lawyer and judge from Connecticut. She is a Judge on the Connecticut Appellate Court.

Appointment to state appellate court
She was appointed by Governor Mary Jodi Rell on April 22, 2009, and reappointed in 2017. Her eight-year term will expire on April 21, 2025.

References

External links
Official Biography on State of Connecticut Judicial Branch website

Living people
1957 births
20th-century American lawyers
21st-century American judges
21st-century American lawyers
Colgate University alumni
Connecticut lawyers
Judges of the Connecticut Appellate Court
People from Boston
Superior court judges in the United States
University of Connecticut School of Law alumni
20th-century American women lawyers
21st-century American women lawyers
21st-century American women judges